Jacob "Jake" Anderson (born April 29, 1984), better known by his stage name Prof, is an American rapper, singer, and songwriter based in Minneapolis, Minnesota. He released his first full-length album, Project Gampo, in 2007 and has since released five additional albums and three EPs. In 2012, City Pages named Prof on their list of Minnesota's 20 best rappers. He was formerly signed to Rhymesayers Entertainment.

Early life
Jacob "Jake" Anderson was born in Minneapolis, Minnesota, and grew up in the city's Powderhorn neighborhood. His mother, Colleen, had a rocky relationship with his father (who suffered from bipolar disorder and was physically abusive) whom she would later divorce and move away from, taking Anderson's three older sisters with her. In his teenage years, he developed a "comedic, dirty-mouthed rap persona" he named Gampo after a childhood friend. Anderson graduated from Minneapolis South High School in 2002.

Music career
In 2010, Prof was part of Rhymesayers' Welcome to Minnesota tour. During the mid-2000s, Prof regularly performed at the Dinkytowner bar with partner and hype man Rahzwell. It was at one such show that Prof would meet his manager, Mike Campbell. Prof and Campbell, along with Dillon Parker, later became co-owners of the Stophouse Music Group, a record label that owns and manages their eponymous Stophouse Studios in northeast Minneapolis.

The staff of City Pages named Prof as Minnesota's 19th-best rapper in 2012, citing his musical dexterity, "his impressive singing voice", and his ability to engage and make audiences laugh. Conversely, musician and critic Dwight Hobbes of the Twin Cities Daily Planet asserted that Prof's 2011 album, King Gampo, was "asinine, narcissistic self-indulgence run completely riot, without a shred of redeeming artistry" and "rap at its worst".

Prof has been noted as one of the few Minneapolis rap acts (in addition to Doomtree and several Rhymesayers artists) who are capable of selling out the city's famed First Avenue Mainroom, and the only to do so in recent years without the backing of Minnesota Public Radio station 89.3 The Current.

In May 2013, when Busta Rhymes failed to show up at the Soundset Music Festival in Shakopee, Minnesota, Prof substituted for him with only an hour's notice.

On December 3, 2013, Prof signed to Rhymesayers Entertainment. The announcement video featured the label's co-founder, Slug, and coincided with the release of a single called "The Reply". The Star Tribune reported on the occasion that Prof would release another album in 2014.

In a May 2015, Prof announced his debut record on Rhymesayers, entitled Liability. In the same interview, he also revealed he had signed with William Morris Endeavor for his future touring ventures. Prof released a single called "Ghost" from the album.  Liability was released October 16, 2015, and peaked at 141 on the Billboard 200 chart November 7, 2015.

On February 20, 2018, Prof announced he would be releasing a new album, titled Pookie Baby, on April 13, 2018. On September 6, 2019, Prof premiered a music video for his song titled "Cousins" featuring Saint Paul, Minnesota rapper, Cashinova.

Additionally, on October 20, 2019, Prof's song "Church" was featured in the opening of Season 2, Episode 4 of ABC's The Rookie.

On April 29, 2020, Prof released his first single, "Squad Goals", from his newly announced album Powderhorn Suites that was due to be released on June 26. However, on June 25, Rhymesayers dropped Prof from their label, stating that they "failed to not only vet the signing of Prof but also calling into question the intentions behind his music, messaging and content more strongly". Rhymesayers further intended to cease the release of Powderhorn Suites to the extent that they could given the imminent release date.

On October 22, 2020, Prof announced the re-release of Powderhorn Suites by his Stophouse Music Group record label and premiered a music video for the song "Animal Patrol" from the album. Powderhorn Suites was released by Stophouse Music Group on November 13, 2020. Prof premiered a music video for his Powderhorn Suites song "Outside Baby" the same day of the album's release. On November 20, 2020, Powderhorn Suites peaked at 36 on the Billboard 200.

Discography
All albums up to 2013 were released by Stophouse Music Group. Liability (2015) and Pookie Baby (2018) were released by Rhymesayers Entertainment. Powderhorn Suites was subsequently released by Stophouse Music Group in 2020.

Studio albums
 Absolutely (2006) 
 Project Gampo (2007)
 Recession Music (2009) 
 King Gampo (2011)
 Liability (2015)
 Pookie Baby (2018)
 Powderhorn Suites (2020)

EPs
 Prof / Ra EP (200*?)
 Kaiser Von Powderhorn (2008)
 Kaiser Von Powderhorn 2 (2010)
 Kaiser Von Powderhorn 3 (2012)

References

External links
 Prof at Stophouse Music Group

Living people
Musicians from Minneapolis
Rappers from Minneapolis
Underground rappers
American male rappers
Midwest hip hop musicians
1984 births
21st-century American rappers
Rhymesayers Entertainment artists
21st-century American male musicians
South High School (Minnesota) alumni
Rappers from Minnesota